Paphiopedilum godefroyae is a species of orchid endemic to peninsular Thailand, Vietnam and Malaysia. This species is found just above sea level on limestone cliffs. The flowers are around 9 cm across, creamy white to light green. They flower from December to July.

References

External links 

godefroyae
Orchids of Malaysia
Orchids of Thailand
Orchids of Vietnam